Vieux-Mareuil (Limousin: Vielh Maruelh) is a former commune in the Dordogne department in Nouvelle-Aquitaine in southwestern France. On 1 January 2017, it was merged into the new commune Mareuil en Périgord.

Population

See also
Communes of the Dordogne department

References

Former communes of Dordogne